Thomas A. Hauke (born May 4, 1938) is an American attorney and retired politician. A member of the Democratic Party, he represented West Allis and west central Milwaukee County in the Wisconsin State Assembly for 20 years (1973–1993), including four years as Majority Leader (1987–1991).

Early life and education 
Hauke was born in Detroit in 1938. He earned a Bachelor of Science from Marquette University, Juris Doctor from the Marquette University Law School, and Master of Science from the Milwaukee School of Engineering.

Career 
Prior to entering politics, Hauke worked as an attorney and electrical engineer.

Hauke was elected to the Wisconsin State Assembly in 1972 and served until 1992, representing the 23rd district, except for one term in 1983-1984 when he represented the 18th district. During his tenure in the Assembly, he served as Majority Leader for the 1987-1988 and 1989-1990 sessions. During his final term in the Assembly, Hauke was fined for accepting illegal gifts from Gary Goyke, a State Senator and lobbyist.

Personal life 
Hauke lived in West Allis, Wisconsin. Hauke was married to Susan (née Johnson) for 53 years. Susan died in 2019.

References

|-

20th-century American lawyers
Democratic Party members of the Wisconsin State Assembly
People from Detroit
Marquette University alumni
Milwaukee School of Engineering alumni
Living people
1938 births